The 2022–23 season is the 109th in the history of Reggina 1914 and their third consecutive season in the second division. The club will participate in Serie B and Coppa Italia.

Players

Other players under contract

Transfers

Pre-season and friendlies

Competitions

Overall record

Serie B

League table

Results summary

Results by round

Matches 
The league fixtures were announced on 15 July 2022.

Coppa Italia

References 

Reggina 1914 seasons
Reggina